Festus Katuna Mbandeka is a Namibian lawyer and politician who was appointed Namibia's attorney general in Hage Geingob's second term cabinet on March 21, 2020.

Mbandeka is a legal practitioner and was admitted to the profession by the High Court of Namibia in 1997. Prior to his government position, he was the CEO of Communications Regulatory Authority of Namibia from September 2015 to March 2020. In the past, he also worked for the Office of the Attorney General, sat on the board of directors of the Namibia Diamond Trading Company, and was the legal advisor for Namibia's tech-com giant Mobile Telecommunication Company (MTC).

References

Living people
Namibian lawyers
Attorneys-General of Namibia
University of Natal alumni
Year of birth missing (living people)